Henry Frederick Howard, 15th Earl of Arundel PC (15 August 160817 April 1652), styled Lord Maltravers until 1640, and Baron Mowbray from 1640 until 1652, was an English nobleman, chiefly remembered for his role in the development of the rule against perpetuities.

Early life
Arundel was the second son of Thomas Howard, 14th Earl of Arundel, and Lady Alethea Talbot, later 13th Baroness Furnivall. His grandmother Anne, the dowager Countess of Arundel, arranged for Henry to be baptised and christened as "Frederick Henry" at Woodstock Palace in October 1608 with Queen Anne as godmother. The Queen's children Henry and Elizabeth were also present.

He studied at St John's College, Cambridge, matriculating in 1624.

Public life
Before ascending to the peerage, Lord Arundel had served as Member of Parliament for Arundel in the Parliament of England from 1628 until 1629. He was again elected to represent Arundel in March 1640, but was called to the House of Lords by writ of acceleration as Baron Mowbray, one of his father's subsidiary titles, before he could take his seat. He also represented Callan in the Parliament of Ireland in 1634.

After his father's death in 1646, he became Earl of Arundel and the titular head of the Howard family. He had been due to inherit his mother's peerage (Baron Furnivall), but he pre-deceased her and upon her death in 1654 it was inherited by his eldest son Thomas.

The entailment
Henry sought to control the succession to his property after his death. Toward that end, he placed in his will a shifting executory limitation so that title to some property would pass to his eldest son (who was mentally deficient) and then to his second son, and title to other property would pass to his second son, and then to his fourth son. The estate plan also included provisions for shifting the titles many generations later if certain conditions should occur.

When his second son, Henry, succeeded to the elder brother's property, he did not want to pass the other property to his younger brother, Charles. Charles sued to enforce his interest, and the court (in this instance, the House of Lords) held that such a shifting condition could not exist indefinitely. The judges believed that tying up property too long beyond the lives of people living at the time was wrong, although the exact period was not determined for another 150 years.

Family
Lord Arundel married Lady Elizabeth Stuart, daughter of Esme Stuart, 3rd Duke of Lennox, on 7 March 1626. They had nine sons and three daughters:

Thomas Howard, 5th Duke of Norfolk (1626/27–1677), died without issue
Henry Howard, 6th Duke of Norfolk (1628–1683/84), had issue; (ancestor of 7th through 9th Dukes of Norfolk)
Philip Howard (1629–1694), Catholic Cardinal
Charles Howard (1630–1713), married Mary Tattershall (d. 1695), had issue, including Henry Howard of Greystoke; who married Mary Aylward (d. 1747), had issue, including Charles Howard, 10th Duke of Norfolk (father of Charles Howard, 11th Duke of Norfolk);
Lady Anne Howard (born 1632)
Lady Catherine Howard (1634–1655)
Talbot Howard (born 1636)
Edward Howard (1637–1691), married Anne Wilbraham, had issue. 
Francis Howard (1640–1683), died in Geele, Belgium as stated in his brother Cardinal Philip Howard's Biography.
Bernard Howard of Glossop (1641–1717), married Catherine Tattershall (died 1727, sister of his brother Charles's wife Mary) and had issue, including Bernard Howard II of Glossop, who married Anne Roper (died 1744), had issue, including Henry Howard of Glossop and Sheffield, who married Juliana Molyneux, had issue, including Bernard Howard, 12th Duke of Norfolk (from who all subsequent Dukes of Norfolk descend) and Lord Henry Howard-Molyneux-Howard;
Esme Howard (1645–1728), had one daughter, who died unmarried
Lady Elizabeth Howard (1651–1705)
John Howard (1652–1711)

Ancestry

References

 thePeerage.com
 Tudor Palace
 

|-

|-

|-

|-

|-

|-

22
305
2nd Earl of Norfolk
Barons Mowbray
19
12
Henry Howard, 22nd Earl of Arundel
1608 births
1652 deaths
Alumni of St John's College, Cambridge
Lord-Lieutenants of Northumberland
Lord-Lieutenants of Cumberland
Lord-Lieutenants of Westmorland
Lord-Lieutenants of Norfolk
Lord-Lieutenants of Surrey
Lord-Lieutenants of Sussex
English MPs 1628–1629
English MPs 1640 (April)
Irish MPs 1634–1635
Members of the Parliament of Ireland (pre-1801) for County Kilkenny constituencies